Fiera della Frecagnola is a festival which is celebrated every in September in the southern Italian mountain village  Cannalonga. The festival is an old tradition that can be traced back to c. 1450, then known as Fiera di Santa Lucia.

References

Folk festivals in Italy
Festivals established in 1450